Dariya Saheb (1674-1780), also Dariya Sahib, Dariya Das, Daryadas and Bihar Wale was a Saint and Bhojpuri poet and the founder of Dariya or Dariyadasi sect. He has written more than twenty Bhojpuri books out of which Gyan Dipak, and Dariya Sagar are most famous. Gyan Dipak is his brief autobiography.

Life 
He was from Dharkhanda Village of Dinara in Shahabad district (presently Rohtas) of Bihar.

Works
Gyan Dipak
Dariya Sagar
Agragyan
Amarsara
Kalcharit
Ganeshgosthi
Prem Mul

References

1674 births
1780 deaths
17th-century Indian poets
People from Rohtas District